SS Georgia was a German passenger ship in service from 1890 until 1914. Interned in the United States during World War I she was sold to an American company, converted to a cargo ship, renamed Housatonic, and was sunk by a German submarine on February 3, 1917.

Ship history 
The ship was built at the Barclay Curle shipyard in Glasgow, Scotland, for the Dampfschiffs-Reederei Hansa ("Hansa Steamship Company", not to be confused with the Hansa Line), and was launched on 13 November 1890 under the name SS Pickhuben. She sailed from Hamburg on 15 April 1891 for her maiden voyage to Quebec and Montreal. In March 1892 DRH was taken over by the Hamburg America Line, but the Pickhuben continued to sail between Hamburg and New York City or Montreal. She was renamed SS Georgia in 1895, and sailed between the then German port of Stettin and New York, transferring to a route between Genoa in northern Italy and New York in 1900. From 1902 she sailed between the Russian Black Sea port of Odessa and New York.

On the outbreak of World War I in 1914 Georgia was interned in the then neutral United States. On 16 April 1915, she was sold for $85,000 to the Housatonic Steamship Corporation, and was used as a freighter. On 23 February 1916, the ship was chartered by  Brown, Jenkinson & Company of London, "for the term of the present war".

Sinking

Housatonic sailed from Galveston, Texas, on 6 January 1917 carrying a cargo of 144,200 bushels of wheat, and after calling at Newport News, Virginia, she sailed for Liverpool on 16 January. According to a statement by Captain Thomas A. Ensor, at 10.30 a.m on 3 February 1917 Housatonic was stopped by the German submarine , under the command of Kapitänleutnant Hans Rose, when about twenty miles south-west of Bishop Rock off the Isles of Scilly.

An officer and two seamen from U-53 boarded the ship, and sent Ensor over to the submarine, where he was questioned by Rose, who spoke fluent English. After examining the Housatonics papers Rose told Ensor to return and order the crew to abandon ship. Rose explained that he was sorry, but the ship was "carrying food supplies to the enemy of my country". The crew launched two lifeboats while the Germans helped themselves to the ship's supply of soap (apparently in short supply in Germany) before opening the seacocks. The U-53 then delivered the coup de grace with a single torpedo, and the Housatonic sank.

Ensor persuaded Rose to take the lifeboats in tow toward the English coast. After two hours a vessel was sighted. Ensor was not convinced that they had been seen, so Rose fired his deck gun to attract her attention, then slipped away. The vessel turned out to be the trawler Salvator which took the crew of Housatonic to Penzance.

Consequences of the sinking
The sinking of Housatonic came at a particularly difficult time for U.S. President Woodrow Wilson, who had been narrowly re-elected the previous year on the platform of keeping the United States out of the war. Germany's announcement of unrestricted submarine warfare commencing on 1 February led to the breaking off of diplomatic relations between Germany and the United States on the same day that the Housatonic was sunk, and this was swiftly followed by the publication of the Zimmermann Telegram. The sinking of the ship provided further ammunition to the pro-war party, and was another step towards to the eventual declaration of war by the United States in April 1917.

Post-war
In 1926 the Housatonic Steamship Company, Inc. sought damages amounting to $839,600 from the German government for the sinking of the Housatonic. The case was heard by Edwin B. Parker on 14 May, who after a long argument as to the actual value of the ship, decided in favour of the Housatonic Steamship Company, but awarded them only $4,500 with 5% annual interest from the date of the sinking.

References

1890 ships
Ships built on the River Clyde
Passenger ships of Germany
Ships of the Hamburg America Line
World War I merchant ships of the United States
Ships sunk by German submarines in World War I
World War I shipwrecks in the Atlantic Ocean